Uranium nitrides is any of a family of several ceramic materials: uranium mononitride (UN), uranium sesquinitride (U2N3) and uranium dinitride (UN2). The word nitride refers to the −3 oxidation state of the nitrogen bound to the uranium.

Uranium nitride has been considered as a potential  nuclear fuel and will be used as such in the BREST-300 nuclear reactor currently under construction in Russia. It is said to be safer, stronger, denser, more thermally conductive and having a higher temperature tolerance. Challenges to implementation of the fuel include a complex conversion route from enriched UF6, the need to prevent oxidation during manufacturing and the need to define and license a final disposal route. The necessity to use expensive, highly isotopically enriched 15N is a significant factor to overcome. This is necessary due to the (relatively) high neutron capture cross-section of the far-more-common 14N, which affects the neutron economy of a reactor.

Synthesis

Carbothermic reduction
The common technique for generating UN is carbothermic reduction of uranium oxide (UO2) in a 2 step method illustrated below.

3UO2 + 6C → 2UC + UO2 + 4CO (in argon, > 1450 °C for 10 to 20 hours)
4UC + 2UO2  +3N2 → 6UN + 4CO

Sol-gel
Sol-gel methods and arc melting of pure uranium under nitrogen atmosphere can also be used.

Ammonolysis
Another common technique for generating UN2 is the ammonolysis of uranium tetrafluoride. Uranium tetrafluoride is exposed to ammonia gas under high pressure and temperature, which replaces the fluorine with nitrogen and generates hydrogen fluoride.<ref name=autogenerated2>Silva, G. W. C.; Yeamans, C. B.; Ma, L.; Cerefice, G. S.; Czerwinski, K. R.; Sarrelberger, A. P.  Chem. Mater.. 2008, 20, 3076.</ref> Hydrogen fluoride is a colourless gas at this temperature and mixes with the ammonia gas.

Hydriding-nitriding
An additional method of UN synthesis employs fabrication directly from metallic uranium. By exposing metallic uranium to hydrogen gas at temperatures in excess of 280 °C, UH3 can be formed. Furthermore, since UH3 has a higher specific volume than the metallic phase, hybridation can be used to physically decompose otherwise solid uranium. Following hybridation, UH3 can be exposed to a nitrogen atmosphere at temperatures around 500 °C, thereby forming U2N3. By additional heating to temperatures above 1150 °C, the sesquinitride can then be decomposed to UN.

2U + 3H2 → 2UH3
2UH3 + 1.5N2 → U2N3
U2N3 → UN + 0.5N2

Use of the isotope 15N (which constitutes around 0.37% of natural nitrogen) is preferable because the predominant isotope, 14N, has a significant neutron absorption cross section which affects neutron economy and, in particular, it undergoes an (n,p) reaction which produces significant amounts of radioactive 14C which would need to be carefully contained and sequestered during reprocessing or permanent storage.

Decomposition
Each uranium dinitride complex is considered to have three distinct compounds present simultaneously because of decomposing of uranium dinitride (UN2) into uranium sesquinitride (U2N3), and then uranium mononitride (UN). Uranium dinitrides decompose to uranium mononitride by the following sequence of reactions:

 4UN2 → 2U2N3+ N2
 2U2N3 → 4UN +N2

Decomposition of UN2 is the most common method for isolating uranium sesquinitride (U2N3).

Uses
Uranium mononitride is being considered as a potential fuel for generation IV reactors such as the Hyperion Power Module reactor created by Hyperion Power Generation. It has also been proposed as nuclear fuel in some fast neutron nuclear test reactors. UN is considered superior because of its higher fissionable density, thermal conductivity, and melting temperature  than the most common nuclear fuel, uranium oxide (UO2), while also demonstrating lower release of fission product gases and swelling, and decreased chemical reactivity with cladding materials.  It also has a superior mechanical, thermal, and radiation stability compared to standard metallic uranium fuel.Mizutani, A.; Sekimoto, H. Ann. Nucl. Energy. 2005, 25(9), 623–638.  The thermal conductivity is on the order of 4–8 times higher than that of uranium dioxide, the most commonly used nuclear fuel, at typical operating temperatures. Increased thermal conductivity results in a smaller thermal gradient between inner and outer sections of the fuel, potentially allowing for higher operating temperatures and reducing macroscopic restructuring of the fuel, which limits fuel lifetime.

Molecular and crystal structure

The uranium dinitride (UN2) compound has a face-centered cubic crystal structure of the calcium fluoride (CaF2) type with a space group of Fmm.
Nitrogen forms triple bonds on each side of uranium forming a linear structure.Wang, X.; Andrews, L.; Vlaisavljevich, B.; Gagliardi, L. Inorganic Chemistry. 2011, 50(8), 3826–3831. doi:10.1021/ic2003244

α-(U2N3) has a body-centered cubic crystal structure of the (Mn2O3) type with a space group of Ia .

UN  has a  face-centered cubic crystal structure of the NaCl type.Mueller, M. H.; Knott, H. W.Acta Crystallogr.. 1958, 11, 751–752.  doi:10.1107/S0365110X58002061
The metal component of the bond uses the 5f orbital of the uranium but forms a relatively weak interaction but is important for the crystal structure.  The covalent portion of the bonds forms from the overlap between the 6d orbital  and 7s orbital  on the uranium and the 2p orbitals on the nitrogen.Évarestov, R. A., Panin, A. I., & Losev, M. V.  Journal of Structural Chemistry. 2008, 48, 125–135. N forms  a triple bond with uranium creating a linear structure.

Uranium nitrido derivatives
Recently, there have been many developments in the synthesis of complexes with terminal uranium nitride (–U≡N) bonds. In addition to radioactive concerns common to all uranium chemistry, production of uranium nitrido complexes has been slowed by harsh reaction conditions and solubility challenges. Nonetheless, syntheses of such complexes have been reported in the past few years, for example the three shown below among others.Thomson, R. K.; Cantat, T.; Scott, B. L.; Morris, D. E.; Batista, E. R.; Kiplinger, J. L. Uranium azide photolysis results in C–H bond activation and provides evidence for a terminal uranium nitride. Nature Chemistry 2010, 2, 723–729.  Other U≡N compounds have also been synthesized or observed with various structural features, such as bridging nitride ligands in di-/polynuclear species, and various oxidation states.Evans, W. J.; Kozimor, S. A.; Ziller, J. W. Molecular Octa-Uranium Rings with Alternating Nitride and Azide Bridges. Science 2005, 309 (5742), 1835–1838. 

See also
 List of energy densities
 Nuclear fuel cycle
 Nuclear reactor
 Uranium carbide
 Uranium oxide

References

External links
 New Uranium Bond at The Periodic Table of Videos'' (University of Nottingham)

Nitrides
Uranium compounds